The Al-Rasool Al-A'dham Mosque is a Shia Islam mosque located in Bankstown, Sydney, New South Wales, Australia.

The mosque is supervised by Ayatollah Mohammad Hussein al-Ansari. The mosque generally promotes Shi'a teachings and is attended almost exclusively by Shi'a worshipers.

See also

 Islam in Australia
 List of mosques in Oceania
 Al-Zahra Mosque

References

Mosques in Sydney
Shia mosques in Australia
Bankstown, New South Wales